Didier Lamkel Zé (born 17 September 1996) is a Cameroonian professional footballer who plays as a forward for Moroccan club Wydad Casablanca on loan from the Belgian club Kortrijk.

Club career

Chamois Niortais
After joining the Lille youth academy from Cameroonian club L'École de Football Brasseries du Cameroun (EFBC), Lamkel Zé progressed through its youth teams. In the summer of 2016, he moved to Chamois Niortais and ended up in the first team. Lamkel Zé made his Ligue 2 debut on 29 July 2016 in the 0–0 draw with RC Lens, coming on as a substitute for Romain Grange late in the match. He scored his first senior goal the following week, the equaliser in a 1–1 draw with Stade Lavallois.

Royal Antwerp
On 24 July 2018, Lamkel Zé joined Belgian First Division A side Antwerp on a four-year deal with the option of a fifth year.

In December 2020, Lamkel Zé was linked to a move to Greek club Panathinaikos to play under former Antwerp manager László Bölöni. To push for the move, Lamkel Zé showed up to training in early January 2021 wearing a shirt of Antwerp's rival, Anderlecht. On 6 January 2021, following a public outrage, Lamkel Zé apologized and issued a public statement re-committing to Antwerp.

Loan to Dunajská Streda
On 6 September 2021, Lamkel Zé signed a one-year loan with Fortuna Liga club Dunajská Streda.

Loan to Khimki
On 7 February 2022, Lamkel Zé joined Russian Premier League club Khimki on loan. The loan was terminated early due to the Russian invasion of Ukraine.

Loan to Metz
According to the special rules introduced by FIFA due to the war, foreign players with Russian clubs were allowed to sign a short-term contract with non-Russian clubs outside of the transfer window. On 1 April 2022, Lamkel Zé moved to Metz on loan under those conditions.

Kortrijk
On 23 August 2022, Lamkel Zé signed a three-year contract with Kortrijk.

Career statistics

Honours
Antwerp
Belgian Cup: 2019–20

References

External links
 
 
 NFT Profile

1996 births
People from Bertoua
Living people
Cameroonian footballers
Cameroon international footballers
Association football midfielders
Lille OSC players
Chamois Niortais F.C. players
Royal Antwerp F.C. players
FC DAC 1904 Dunajská Streda players
FC Khimki players
FC Metz players
K.V. Kortrijk players
Wydad AC players
Ligue 2 players
Belgian Pro League players
Slovak Super Liga players
Russian Premier League players
Ligue 1 players
Botola players
Cameroonian expatriate footballers
Expatriate footballers in France
Cameroonian expatriate sportspeople in France
Expatriate footballers in Belgium
Cameroonian expatriate sportspeople in Belgium
Expatriate footballers in Slovakia
Cameroonian expatriate sportspeople in Slovakia
Expatriate footballers in Russia
Cameroonian expatriate sportspeople in Russia
Expatriate footballers in Morocco
Cameroonian expatriate sportspeople in Morocco